Dickenson Point is a point in the U.S. state of Washington.

Dickenson Point was named after Thomas Dickenson, a member of an 1841 exploring party.

References

Landforms of Thurston County, Washington
Headlands of Washington (state)